Acraea matuapa is a butterfly in the family Nymphalidae. It is found in Kenya, in the eastern part of the country and along the coast. The habitat consists of grassy areas in and around coastal forests.

References

External links

Images representing Acraea matuapa at Bold
Acraea matuapa at Pteron

Butterflies described in 1889
matuapa
Endemic insects of Kenya
Butterflies of Africa
Taxa named by Henley Grose-Smith